Heini Hemmi (born 17 January 1949) is a Swiss former alpine skier, winner of the giant slalom competition at the 1976 Winter Olympics. He also won the Giant Slalom World Cup 1976-77. His younger brother Christian was on the podium thrice at the 1976–77 World Cup.

He is the older brother of the other alpine skiere (3 podiums in World Cup) Christian Hemmi.

World Cup victories

References

External links
 
 

1949 births
Swiss male alpine skiers
Alpine skiers at the 1976 Winter Olympics
Olympic alpine skiers of Switzerland
Medalists at the 1976 Winter Olympics
Olympic medalists in alpine skiing
Olympic gold medalists for Switzerland
FIS Alpine Ski World Cup champions
Living people
20th-century Swiss people